Majur may refer to:

 Majur, Sisak-Moslavina County, a municipality in Croatia
 Majur, Zagreb County, a village near Farkaševac, Croatia
 Majur (Jagodina), a village in Serbia
 Majur (Šabac), a village in Serbia